Alexander Haley Jeffery (29 January 1909 – 11 May 1987) was a Liberal party member of the House of Commons of Canada. He was born in London, Ontario and became a barrister by career.

Jeffery was educated at the University of Western Ontario and at Osgoode Hall Law School. He achieved a Bachelor of Arts degree in economics and political science.

He was first elected to Parliament at the London riding in the 1949 general election and served only one term, the 21st Canadian Parliament and did not seek re-election in the 1953 election.

Jeffery also held various corporate directorships.

References

External links
 

1909 births
1987 deaths
Lawyers in Ontario
Liberal Party of Canada MPs
Members of the House of Commons of Canada from Ontario
Osgoode Hall Law School alumni
Politicians from London, Ontario
University of Western Ontario alumni
20th-century Canadian lawyers